EmuTOS is a replacement for TOS (the operating system of the Atari ST and its successors), released as free software. It is mainly intended to be used with Atari emulators and clones, such as Hatari or FireBee. EmuTOS provides support for more modern hardware and avoids the use of the old, proprietary TOS as it is usually difficult to obtain.

Features and compatibility 
Unlike the original TOS, the latest EmuTOS can work (sometimes with limited support) on all Atari hardware, even on some Amiga computers, and has support for features not available before: ColdFire CPU, IDE, FAT partitions and emulators' "Native Features" support.

Support lacks for some deprecated OS APIs, though all Line-A API functions are included. By design, EmuTOS lacks support for non-documented OS features. It has some support for Atari Falcon sound matrix, including DSP support since version 1.1, and while VDI supports 1-, 2-, 4- and 8-bit interleaved graphics modes, support for Atari Falcon (or Amiga) 16-bit resolutions is completely missing. Therefore, certain old games, demos and applications, and also some Falcon-specific software may not work.

Gallery

Releases 
Release 0.9.1: support for Firebee evaluation boards, 256 colours display for VIDEL systems and XBIOS DMA sound functions. EmuCON2 shell with TAB completion, and renaming of folders was added. A full-featured desktop is now included also with the smallest 192k ROM version.

Release 0.9.2 (and its bugfix release 0.9.3): support for SD/MMC Cards, the external IDE connector and poweroff functions on the Firebee platform. CompactFlash can be used, IDE media handling, FAT partition and media change detection were enhanced. Fixes and improvements for EmuTOS-RAM booting, fVDI compatibility and general VDI speed, ACSI and XHDI support (see Atari TOS).

Release 0.9.4: compiled with -O2 by default for better performance (except for 192k version), use less RAM and add new variant for ColdFire Evaluation Boards with BaS_gcc ("BIOS"). Desktop can now display text files and move files/folders with Control key.

Release 0.9.5: fix issues with STeem emulator hard disk emulation, add Alt+arrow mouse emulation, Pexec mode 7 support, dual keyboard support, user can specify boot partition at startup, recovery from exceptions in user programs, stack initialization on Amiga, translated text object alignment improvements, support for all line-A functions completed.

Release 0.9.6: Fixes for real TT HW and full VDI support for Atari TT video and all resolutions. Enable MIDI input, add EmuCON 'mode' command and support for etv_term() function. Many fixes.

Release 0.9.7: support for extended MBR partitions, MonSTer board, Eiffel on CAN bus on ColdFire EVB and Apollo Core 68080.  FreeMiNT support on non-Atari hardware. Desktop 'Install devices', 'Install icon' and 'Remove desktop icon' features. Standalone version of EmuCON2.

Release 1.1: Add support for colour icons, colour windows, Falcon DSP, interrupt-driven I/O for MFP and TT-MFP serial ports, 
improve Nova video card support in several areas, online manual for EmuTOS, support for Hungarian & Turkish languages

Release 1.2: Add support for 3D objects (enabled in 512k ROMs and PRG), Add support for new menu_xxx() functions in AES 3.30, Allow up to 16 windows for versions with AES 3.30 support, Add interrupt-driven I/O for SCC serial ports, EmuDesk: Resize screen memory in videl modes, just like TOS4, Better looking separators in menus, Underlined dialog titles, bugfixes

See also 
 MiNT
 Atari TOS

External links 
 EmuTOS project - internationalized GPL version of TOS ROMs (based on open-sourced GEM sources Caldera bought from Novell in 1996 along with DR-DOS)
 EmuTOS source code moved from SourceForge to GitHub after 0.9.7 release

References 

Atari ST software
Disk operating systems
Free software operating systems
Atari operating systems
GEM software
Hobbyist operating systems